Maguiresbridge is a small village in County Fermanagh, Northern Ireland. The village is named after the bridge over the Colebrooke River, first built by the local Maguire family about 1760. The village is 8 miles from Enniskillen and 3 miles from Lisnaskea.

Demography 
On Census day (27 March 2011) there were 1,020 people living in Maguiresbridge.

Of these:
24.80% were aged under 16 years 
11.37% were aged 65 or over
52.16% were female and 47.84% were male 
49.61% were from a Protestant background
46.47% were from a Catholic background 
5.65% of people aged between 16 and 74 were unemployed

History

Old railway 
At the beginning of the 20th century, Maguiresbridge was served by four railways which stretched throughout Ulster. At that time, Maguiresbridge and Clones were two of the major junctions from Derry, Omagh, and Belfast into north Leinster, in particular, the major market towns of Athlone, Cavan, and Mullingar via the Inney junction. This back-bone rail infrastructure was administered by the Midland Great Western Railway which also linked to other major towns: namely, Sligo, Tullamore, via Clara, cities such as Dublin, Limerick, and other market towns on the south coast.

Maguiresbridge railway station on the Great Northern Railway opened on 1 March 1859 and was shut on 1 October 1957. The station serving as the western terminus of the narrow gauge Clogher Valley Railway opened on 2 May 1887 and was shut on 1 January 1942.

The Troubles 
The most notable incident occurred on 11 February 1986 when off-duty member of the Royal Ulster Constabulary Derek Breen (aged 29) was shot dead by the Provisional Irish Republican Army in the Talk of the Town Bar (now the Coach Inn). During the same incident John McCabe (aged 25), who was working as a barman there, was caught in the gunfire and died on scene.

21st century
Maguiresbridge grew considerably during the 2010s, with the building of five new housing developments holding 350 houses. New shops were also built during this time.

Education 
Primary Education
 St. Mary's Roman Catholic Primary
 Maguiresbridge Controlled Primary
Maguiresbridge does not cater for secondary education. Eligible residents would travel to Lisnaskea and Enniskillen to receive secondary education.

Churches 
 Roman Catholic (Saint Mary's Church)
 Church of Ireland (Christchurch)
 Methodist Church
 Presbyterian Church in Ireland

Sport
Maguiresbridge is home to both a soccer and Gaelic football club. Saint Mary's GFC is a Gaelic football club with its grounds on the Drumgoon Road, whilst the soccer club plays its games in Lisnaskea.

References 

Villages in County Fermanagh